Events in the year 1961 in Brazil.

Incumbents

Federal government
 President: Juscelino Kubitschek (until 30 January), Jânio Quadros (from 31 January to 25 August), Ranieri Mazzilli (from 25 August to September 7), João Goulart (starting September 7)
 Prime Minister: Tancredo Neves (starting 8 September)
 Vice President: João Goulart (until 25 August), vacant (from August 25)

Governors 
 Alagoas: Sebastião Muniz Falcão (until 31 January); Luis Cavalcante (from 31 January)
 Amazonas: Gilberto Mestrinho
 Bahia:	Juracy Magalhães 
 Ceará: Parsifal Barroso 
 Espírito Santo:Raul Giuberti
 Goiás: José Feliciano Ferreira (until 31 January); Mauro Borges (from 31 January)
 Guanabara: Carlos Lacerda
 Maranhão: Newton de Barros Belo (from 31 January)
 Mato Grosso: João Ponce de Arruda then Fernando Corrêa da Costa 
 Minas Gerais: José Francisco Bias Fortes (until 31 January); José de Magalhães Pinto (from 31 January)
 Pará: Luís de Moura Carvalho (until 31 January); Aurélio do Carmo (from 31 January)
 Paraíba: José Fernandes de Lima (until 31 January); Pedro Gondim (from 31 January)
 Paraná: Moisés Lupion then Nei Braga 
 Pernambuco: Cid Sampaio 
 Piauí: Chagas Rodrigues 
 Rio de Janeiro: Roberto Silveira (until 28 February); Celso Peçanha (from 28 February)                                                                    
 Rio Grande do Norte: Dinarte de Medeiros Mariz (until 31 January); Aluízio Alves (from 31 January)
 Rio Grande do Sul: Leonel Brizola 
 Santa Catarina: Heriberto Hülse (until 31 January); Celso Ramos (from 31 January)
 São Paulo: Carlos Alberto Alves de Carvalho Pinto 
 Sergipe: Luís Garcia

Vice governors
 Alagoas: Sizenando Nabuco de Melo (until 31 January); Teotônio Brandão Vilela (from 31 January)
 Bahia: Orlando Moscoso 
 Ceará: Wilson Gonçalves 
 Espírito Santo: Raul Giuberti 
 Goiás: João de Abreu (until 31 January); Antônio Rezende Monteiro (from 31 January)
 Maranhão: Alexandre Alves Costa (until 31 January); Alfredo Salim Duailibe (from 31 January)
 Mato Grosso: Henrique José Vieira Neto (until 31 January); Jose Garcia Neto (from 31 January)
 Minas Gerais: Artur Bernardes Filho (until 31 January); Clóvis Salgado da Gama (from 31 January)
 Pará: Newton Burlamaqui de Miranda (from 31 January)
 Paraíba: Pedro Gondim (until 31 January); André Avelino de Paiva Gadelha (from 31 January)
 Pernambuco: Pelópidas da Silveira 
 Piauí: Tibério Nunes 
 Rio de Janeiro: Celso Peçanha (until 1 March); vacant thereafter (from 31 January)
 Rio Grande do Norte: José Augusto Varela (until 31 January); Walfredo Gurgel (from 31 January)
 Santa Catarina: Armindo Marcílio Doutel de Andrade (from 31 January)
 São Paulo: Porfírio da Paz 
 Sergipe: Dionísio Machado

Events 
 August 25 to September 7 – Campanha da Legalidade.
 December 17 – A circus tent fire in Niterói kills 323.

Deaths

See also 
 1961 in Brazilian television

References

External links 

 
1960s in Brazil
Years of the 20th century in Brazil
Brazil
Brazil